Luis Sandi Meneses (22 February 1905, Mexico City – 1996), was a musician, teacher and composer.

Biography
The complete name is Luis Sandi Meneses.  Born February 22, 1905 in Mexico City, the only child of Genaro Sandi and María Meneses.  Sandi did not attend public primary school, but was privately tutored by his mother's sister, Manuela Meneses, who was a public school teacher.  Between the ages of six and fourteen Sandi lived in Tacubaya, a suburb of Mexico city.
As his interest in music increased, at the age of fifteen Sandi entered the National Conservatory of music where he studied violin with José Rocabruna, an eminent Spanish violinist.  Sandi studied voice with Elvira González, and composition with Estanislao Mejía (b. 1882) a nationalist.  Sandi also had a composition workshop with Carlos Chávez with whom he studied instrumental conducting.

Luis Sandi conducted in various instances Orquesta Sinfónica de México and Orquesta Sinfónica Nacional. At one time, he focused on composition. From his production, opera Carlota (libretto by Francisco Zendejas) and Bonampak ballet stand out. His continuous contact with Coro de Madrigalistas (which he founded in 1938)  made him compose and arrange a wide range of choral works. He is author of many books for music alumni. Sandi was also member of International Music Council of UNESCO, for 1963-1966 period, and member of Consejo Interamericano de Música.

Works

Instrumental

Solos
Fátima (suite galante) (1948) (6') - guit.
Sonata para violín (1969) (10')
Miniatura (1995) (3') - viola

Duos
Pastoral - oboe, piano
Aire antiguo (1927) (13') - violin and piano
Canción erótica (1927) (4') - violin and piano
Hoja de álbum (1956) (4') - violoncello and piano
Hoja de álbum no.2 (4') - viola and piano
Sonatina para violoncello y piano (1959) (5')
Suite para oboe y piano (1982) (12´) 
Sonata para oboe y violoncello (1983) (11')

Trios
Tres momentos (1978) (6') - violín, violoncello y piano
Variación para tres flautas dulces (1979) - fl

Quartets
Cuarteto para instrumentos de arco (1938) (9') 
Cuatro momentos (1961) (5') 
Cuatro piezas (1977) (5') - flautas dulces

Quintets
Quinteto (1960) (6') - flute, clarinet, trumpet, violin and violoncello

Chamber orch.
Suite de la hoja de plata (1939) (12') 
Cinco gacelas (1968) (8') 
Trenos in memoriam Carlos Chávez (1978) (6') 
Sinfonía mínima (1978) (8')

Symphonic orch.
Los cuatro coroneles de la reina (1978) (7') - (vers. orch.)
Sonora (1933)
Suite banal (1936) (10')
La angostura (1939)
Norte (1940)
 Tú Fú (1956)
 Segunda Sinfonía (1979)

Symphonic orch. and soloist
Concertino (1944) (7') - flauta y orq.
Poemas de amor y muerte (1966) (9') - voice and orch. Text: Greek epigraphs
Il cántico delle creature (1971) (10') - voice and orch. Text: Sn. Francisco de Asis
Ajorca de cantos floridos (1977) (6') - voice and orch. Text: Nahuatl poetry

Ballet
Día de difuntos (1938) (8') - orch.
Coatlicue (1949) (12') -orch.
Bonampak (1951) (20') -orch.

Vocal

Operas
 Carlota (1947) (30') Libretto: Francisco Zendejas Gómez
 La señora en su balcón (1954) (45')

Voice and piano
¡Oh, luna!
Las cuatro coronelas de la reina (1928) (7') - Text: Amado Nervo
Madrigal (1936) (2') - Text: Amado Nervo
Diez hai-kais (1933) (4') - Text: José Juan Tablada
Canción obscura (1934) (3') - 
Diez hai-kais para canto y piano (1947) - Text: José Juan Tablada
Canción de la vida profunda (1947) (5') - Text: Porfirio Barba Jacob
Cuatro cannciones de amor (1955)  (7') - Text: Rafael Alberti; Ramón López Velarde; anonymous
Poemas del amor y de la muerte (1963) (6') - Text: Omar Khayyam; Greek epigraphs
Destino (1968) (5') -  Text: Isabel Farfán Cano 
Cinco poemas de Salvador Novo (1975) (3')- soprano, mezzo y piano

Voice and other instruments
Rubayaits - voice, trumpet, horn, trombone Text: Omar Khayyam
El venado (1932) (8') - voice, flute, trumpet, trombone, 2 violins, vihuela, guitarrón, marimba and percussion
¿Qué traerá la paloma? (1958) (1') - voice and guitar
Paloma ramo de sal (1947) (11') - voice and guitarra
Poema en el espacio (1961) (3') - voice and violoncello
Ave María (1981) - voice and organ  Text: Elías Nandino

Choir
Silenciosamente (1930) (1') - mixed choir Text: Amado Nervo
Tres madrigales  (1932) (5') 
Quisiérate peor, Nísida, cuenta (1947) (4') - mixed choir Text: Miguel de Cervantes
 Los Xtoles (1947)
Amanece (1948) - mixed choir Text: Alfonso del Río
Canto de amor y muerte (1956) (6') - mixed choir Text: Ramón López Velarde
A la muerte de Madero (1960) (2') - mixed choir
Cinco gacelas (1960) (6') - mixed choir
Cantata a la tumba de García Lorca (1977) (8') - mixed choir

Choir and instruments
Las troyanas (1937) (10') - coro mixto 2 obs, c.i., fg, arpa y perc. Texto: Euripides
Mi corazón se amerita (1939) (4') coro mixto y 2 pianos Text: Ramón López Velarde

Choir and symphonic orch.
Gloria a los héroes (1947) (7') 
La suave patria (1951) (7') - Text: Ramón López Velarde

References 

The Choral Music of Luis Sandi, doctoral dissertation submitted to the Committee on Advanced Studies at Southwestern Baptist Theological Seminary, Fort Worth, TX in partial fulfillment of the requirements for the Degree Doctor of Musical Arts, by Leslie Gomez, May 1984.

Alcaraz, José Antonio (1991). Reflexiones sobre el nacionalismo musical mexicano. México: Editorial Patria.
Soto Millán, Eduardo (1998). Diccionario de Compositores Mexicanos de Música de Concierto. Siglo XX. Tomo II (I-Z)

External links

1905 births
1996 deaths
Musicians from Mexico City
Mexican male classical composers
Mexican classical composers
20th-century classical composers
Academic staff of the National Conservatory of Music of Mexico
20th-century male musicians